KWVR may refer to:

 KWVR (AM), a radio station (1340 AM) licensed to Enterprise, Oregon, United States
 KWVR-FM, a radio station (92.1 FM) licensed to Enterprise, Oregon, United States
 Keighley & Worth Valley Railway, a heritage railway line in West Yorkshire, England